Breckinridge County is a county located in the Commonwealth of Kentucky. As of the 2020 census, the population was 20,432. Its county seat is Hardinsburg, Kentucky. The county was named for John Breckinridge (1760–1806), a Kentucky Attorney General, state legislator, United States Senator, and United States Attorney General. It was the 38th Kentucky county in order of formation. Breckinridge County is now a wet county, following a local option election on January 29, 2013, but it had been a dry county for the previous 105 years.

History
The area presently bounded by Kentucky state lines was a part of the U.S. State of Virginia, known as Kentucky County when the British colonies separated themselves in the American Revolutionary War. In 1780, the Virginia legislature divided the previous Kentucky County into three smaller units: Fayette, Jefferson, and Lincoln. In 1791, this area was separated into the State of Kentucky; it became effective on June 1, 1792. From that time, the original three counties were divided several times. A portion of Jefferson County was split off as Nelson County in 1784; a portion of Nelson was split off as Hardin County in 1792; the present Breckinridge County was split off from Hardin in 1799.

In August 1779, Sinclair Hardin (first cousin of Captain William Hardin, the founder of Hardin's Fort), was killed by Shawnee Indians while taking a drink at Big Springs. He was the first white settler in Breckinridge County to be killed by Native Americans. The Indian threat continued for several years. However, the only sizable expedition against the Native Americans that Breckinridge County settlers took part in culminated in the Battle of Saline Creek in August 1786, in Illinois. The battle only lasted a few minutes, with fierce hand-to-hand combat. Between 18 and 30 Shawnee warriors were killed, with six more wounded. The remainder of the Shawnee fled. Captain William Hardin had commanded the Kentucky volunteers, many of whom also were killed or wounded. Hardin's militia brought home 16 Shawnee scalps, nine captured horses, 17 muskets, and "a mighty nice sword".

The Judge-Executive of Breckinridge County from 1801 to 1805 was William Comstock. Jo Allen was the county clerk, and Ben Huff was the sheriff.

During the American Civil War, raiding Kentucky Confederate cavalry burned the courthouse, as it was being used by Union troops as a barracks, though most of the records were saved. On March 12, 1865, Jerome Clarke, a well known Confederate guerrilla, claimed by some to have been Sue Munday, was captured near the Breckinridge–Meade County line. He was hanged three days later in Louisville. Afterward, his trial drew heavy criticism.

During the nineteenth century, the Victoria Coal Mines, named in honor of British Queen Victoria, were the first to produce coal oil, and Cloverport exported it to Great Britain, where it was used to light Buckingham Palace.

United States Supreme Court Justice Wiley Blount Rutledge Jr., who served on the High Court from 1943 to 1949, was born at Tar Springs in 1894, when his father was pastor of Cloverport Baptist Church.

On June 6, 1932, at Hardinsburg, Sam Jennings became the penultimate person to be publicly executed in the United States.

In the 1950s, Rough River Dam State Resort Park was developed at the southern border of the county.

A third courthouse fire nearly destroyed county records in 1958.

Breckinridge County High School won the 1965 and 1995 Kentucky High School Athletic Association's Boys' Basketball tournaments.

The Breckinridge County Archives, formed in 1984, was the first state-funded archival repository in the history of the United States and is known across the nation as an excellent resource for genealogical and historical research.

Geography

Adjacent counties
 Perry County, Indiana  (northwest)
 Meade County  (northeast/EST Border)
 Hardin County  (east/EST Border)
 Grayson County  (south)
 Ohio County  (southwest)
 Hancock County  (west)

Demographics

As of the census of 2000, there were 18,648 people, 7,324 households, and 5,309 families residing in the county. The racial makeup of the county was 95.84% White, 2.86% Black or African American, 0.23% Native American, 0.08% Asian, 0.02% Pacific Islander, 0.09% from other races, and 0.90% from two or more races. 0.72% of the population were Hispanic or Latino of any race.

There were 7,324 households, out of which 31.00% had children under the age of 18 living with them, 59.60% were married couples living together, 8.90% had a female householder with no husband present, and 27.50% were non-families. 24.60% of all households were made up of individuals, and 11.60% had someone living alone who was 65 years of age or older. The average household size was 2.51 and the average family size was 2.97.

In the county, the population was spread out, with 24.90% under the age of 18, 8.20% from 18 to 24, 26.70% from 25 to 44, 26.00% from 45 to 64, and 14.20% who were 65 years of age or older. The median age was 38 years. For every 100 females there were 98.60 males. For every 100 females age 18 and over, there were 96.30 males.

The median income for a household in the county was $30,554, and the median income for a family was $36,575. Males had a median income of $31,004 versus $19,371 for females. The per capita income for the county was $15,402.  About 11.80% of families and 15.80% of the population were below the poverty line, including 16.60% of those under age 18 and 19.00% of those age 65 or over.

Education

K-12 education
School districts include:
 Breckinridge County School District
 Cloverport Independent School District

It also has a private school:
 Saint Romuald Interparochial School

Library
Breckinridge County Public Library is located at 308 Old Highway 60 in Hardinsburg, Kentucky.

Communities

Incorporated Communities

 Cloverport
 Hardinsburg (county seat)
 Irvington

Unincorporated Communities A–L

 Addison
 Axtel
 Bewleyville
 Big Spring (partially in Hardin County and Meade County in the Eastern Time Zone)
 Cannons Point
 Clifton Mills
 Constantine
 Custer
 Dyer
 Fairfield
 Falls of Rough (mostly in Grayson County)
 Fisher
 Frymire
 Garfield
 Glen Dean
 Harned
 Hinton Hills
 Holt
 Hudson
 Kingswood
 Kirk
 Locust Hill
 Lodiburg

Unincorporated Communities M–Z

 Madrid
 Mattingly
 McCoy
 McDaniels
 McQuady
 Mook
 Mooleyville
 Mount Merino
 Mystic
 Raymond
 Roff
 Sample
 Se Ree
 Stephensport
 Tar Fork
 Union Star
 Vanzant
 Webster
 Westview

Notable natives
 Alfred "Butch" Beard - professional basketball player and coach
 David "Big Dave" DeJernett - professional basketball player
 Philip Leget Edwards - American educator
 Joseph Holt - Judge Advocate General of the United States Army, Attorney General - Secretary of War, Commissioner of Patents, and Postmaster General.
 Bobbi Jordan - American actress
 John Alexander McClernand - Union General during the American Civil War
 Charles Harwood Moorman—Judge of the Kentucky Court of Appeals, Judge of the United States District Court for the Western District of Kentucky, and Judge of the United States Court of Appeals for the Sixth Circuit
 George W. Swink - businessman
 Tera Wray -  pornographic actress
 Joe Wright - Majority floor leader in the Kentucky State Senate

Politics

See also

 National Register of Historic Places listings in Breckinridge County, Kentucky

References

 
1799 establishments in Kentucky
Kentucky counties
Kentucky counties on the Ohio River
Populated places established in 1799